In mathematics, the Gromov product is a concept in the theory of metric spaces named after the  mathematician Mikhail Gromov. The Gromov product can also be used to define δ-hyperbolic metric spaces in the sense of Gromov.

Definition

Let (X, d) be a metric space and let x, y, z ∈ X. Then the Gromov product of y and z at x, denoted (y, z)x, is defined by

Motivation

Given three points x, y, z in the metric space X, by the triangle inequality there exist non-negative numbers a, b, c such that . In the case that the points x, y, z are the outer nodes of a tripod then these Gromov products are the lengths of the edges.

In the hyperbolic, spherical or euclidean plane, the Gromov product (A, B)C equals the distance p between C and the point where the incircle of the geodesic triangle ABC touches the edge CB  or CA. Indeed from the diagram , so that . Thus for any metric space, a geometric interpretation of (A, B)C is obtained by isometrically embedding (A, B, C) into the euclidean plane.

Properties

 The Gromov product is symmetric: (y, z)x = (z, y)x.
 The Gromov product degenerates at the endpoints: (y, z)y = (y, z)z = 0.
 For any points p, q, x, y and z,

Points at infinity

Consider hyperbolic space Hn. Fix a base point p and let  and  be two distinct points at infinity. Then the limit 

exists and is finite, and therefore can be considered as a generalized Gromov product. It is actually given by the formula 
 

δ-hyperbolic spaces and divergence of geodesics

The Gromov product can be used to define δ-hyperbolic spaces in the sense of Gromov.: (X, d) is said to be δ-hyperbolic if, for all p, x, y and z in X,

In this case. Gromov product measures how long geodesics remain close together. Namely, if x, y and z are three points of a δ-hyperbolic metric space then the initial segments of length (y, z)x of geodesics from x to y and x to z are no further than 2δ apart (in the sense of the Hausdorff distance between closed sets).

Notes

References

 
 

Metric geometry
Hyperbolic metric space